La Roque-Sainte-Marguerite is a commune in the Aveyron department in southern France.

Lying deep in the scenic Dourbie gorge, the commune absorbed the formerly separate commune of St Verin in 1940, and it also incorporates the village of Pierrefiche du Larzac, which lies much higher on the Causse du Larzac (Larzac Plateau), at about 670 metres above sea level.

The main industry for the residents who still work locally is tourism: the most visited site in Aveyron for tourists, Le Chaos de Montpellier-le-Vieux, is within its bounds. But most working residents commute into Millau.

On the Causse du Larzac, the villagers of Pierrefiche were shepherds, bringing their ewes' milk to the village dairy to make Roquefort cheese. Until recently there were two flocks of 50 & 200 ewes. The droughts of 2004 have reduced this to one. The sheepskins & fleeces went to Millau for the glove industry.

The castle was the western defence of the formerly heavily guarded Dourbie valley, which was a rich agricultural area in the Middle Ages. Old vine terraces can still be seen lining the deep chasm cut by the river through the Causse plateaux, some 300 m deep.

Population

See also
Communes of the Aveyron department

References

Communes of Aveyron
Aveyron communes articles needing translation from French Wikipedia